Péter Halász may refer to:

Péter Halász (actor) (1944–2006), Hungarian actor and director
Péter Halász (conductor) (born 1976), Hungarian conductor and pianist